Charles Lafayette King (February 21, 1895 – May 7, 1957) was an American film actor who appeared in more than 400 films between 1915 and 1956. King was born in Dallas, Texas, and died in Hollywood, California, from cirrhosis of liver.

Selected filmography

 The Birth of a Nation (1915)
 Singing River (1921)
 A Motion to Adjourn (1921)
 The Black Bag (1922)
 Merry-Go-Round (1923)
 Hearts of the West (1925)
 Range Courage (1927)
 Barnum & Ringling, Inc. (1928)
 Sisters of Eve (1928)
 The Dawn Trail (1930)
 Beyond the Law (1930)
 Branded Men (1931)
 Alias – the Bad Man (1931)
 The Pocatello Kid (1931)
 Two Gun Man (1931)
 Honor of the Mounted (1932)
 The Hurricane Express (1932)
 Outlaw Justice (1932)
 Young Blood (1932)
 The Fighting Champ (1932)
 The Gay Buckaroo (1932)
 Ghost City (1932)
 A Man's Land (1932)
 Strawberry Roan (1933)
 The Fighting Parson (1933)
 The Prescott Kid (1934)
 His Fighting Blood (1935)
 Mississippi (1935) - Desk Clerk
 Red Blood of Courage (1935)
 The Lawless Nineties (1936)
 Hearts in Bondage (1936)
 Idaho Kid (1936)
 Men of the Plains (1936)
 The Fighting Deputy (1937)
 The Gambling Terror (1937)
 Luck of Roaring Camp (1937)
 Riders of the Rockies (1937)
 Frontier Town (1938)
 Frontiers of '49 (1939)
 The Taming of the West (1939)
 Deadwood Dick (1940)
 Billy the Kid in Texas (1940)
 Billy the Kid's Gun Justice (1940)
 Lightning Strikes West (1940)
 Wild Horse Range (1940)
 Forbidden Trails (1941)
 Law of the Range (1941)
 The Lone Rider Crosses the Rio (1941)
 The Lone Rider in Ghost Town (1941)
 The Lone Rider Ambushed (1941)
 The Lone Rider Fights Back (1941)
 White Eagle (1941)
 Billy the Kid in Santa Fe (1941)
 Billy the Kid Wanted (1941)
 Billy the Kid's Round-Up (1941)
 Border Roundup (1942)
 Outlaws of Boulder Pass (1942)
 Overland Stagecoach (1942)
 Arizona Stage Coach (1942)
 Trail Riders (1942)
 Sheriff of Sage Valley (1942)
 Riders of the Rio Grande (1943)
 Raiders of Red Gap (1943)
 Two Fisted Justice (1943)
 Haunted Ranch (1943)
 Land of Hunted Men (1943)
 The Kid Rides Again (1943)
 Western Cyclone (1943)
 Cattle Stampede (1943)
 Devil Riders (1943)
 Dead or Alive (1944)
 The Great Mike (1944)
 Brand of the Devil (1944)
 Land of the Outlaws (1944)
 Arizona Whirlwind (1944)
 Frontier Outlaws (1944)
 Harmony Trail (1944)
 Valley of Vengeance (1944)
 Oath of Vengeance (1944)
 Fuzzy Settles Down (1944)
 Rustlers' Hideout (1944)
 His Brother's Ghost (1945)
 Shadows of Death (1945)
 Gangster's Den (1945)
 Border Badmen (1945)
 Outlaws of the Plains (1946)
 Ghost of Hidden Valley (1946)
 Prairie Badmen (1946)
 Brick Bradford (1947)
 Killer at Large (1947)
 Oklahoma Blues (1948)
 Adventures of Sir Galahad (1949)
 Gunsmoke - TV Series  (1956–57) as a Townsman & a Trial Spectator (uncredited)

References

External links

1895 births
1957 deaths
American male film actors
American male silent film actors
20th-century American male actors
Deaths from cirrhosis
Male actors from Texas
People from Hillsboro, Texas
Male Western (genre) film actors